In algebra, Auslander–Reiten theory studies the representation theory of Artinian rings using techniques such as Auslander–Reiten sequences (also called almost split sequences) and Auslander–Reiten quivers.

Almost-split sequences

Suppose that R is an Artin algebra. A sequence 
0→ A → B → C → 0
of finitely generated left modules over R is called an almost-split sequence (or Auslander–Reiten sequence) if it has the following properties:
The sequence is not split
C is indecomposable and any homomorphism from an indecomposable module to C that is not an isomorphism factors through B.
A is indecomposable and any homomorphism from A to an indecomposable module that is not an isomorphism factors through B.

For any finitely generated left module C that is indecomposable but not projective there is an almost-split sequence as above, which is unique up to isomorphism. Similarly for any finitely generated left module A that is indecomposable but not injective there is an almost-split sequence as above, which is unique up to isomorphism.

The module A in the almost split sequence is isomorphic to D Tr C, the dual of the transpose of C.

Example

Suppose that R is the ring k[x]/(xn) for a field k and an integer n≥1. The indecomposable modules are isomorphic to one of k[x]/(xm) for 1≤ m ≤ n, and the only projective one has m=n. The almost split sequences are isomorphic to 

for  1 ≤ m < n. The first morphism takes a to (xa, a) and the second takes (b,c) to b − xc.

Auslander-Reiten quiver

The Auslander-Reiten quiver of an Artin algebra has a vertex for each indecomposable module and an arrow between vertices if there is an irreducible morphism between the corresponding modules. It has a map τ = D Tr called the translation from the non-projective vertices to the non-injective vertices, where D is the dual and Tr the transpose.

References

External links

Representation theory